= Cirtsville, West Virginia =

Unincorporated community in West Virginia, United States

Cirtsville
- Unincorporated community
- Location within the state of West Virginia Cirtsville (the United States)
- Coordinates: 37°52′53″N 81°15′57″W
- Country: United States
- State: West Virginia
- County: Raleigh
- Elevation: 1,650 ft (500 m)
- Time zone: UTC-5 (Eastern (EST))
  - Summer (DST): UTC-4 (EDT)
- GNIS feature ID: 1549625

Cirtsville is an unincorporated community located in Raleigh County, West Virginia, United States. The community derives its name from Curt Vass, an early settler.
